Ion Stepanovici Codreanu (born 14 April 1879 Ștefănești, Florești, Soroca County; died 15 February 1949 Bucharest) was a Moldovan politician.

Biography 
In 1917, Codreanu was a founding member of the National Moldavian Party. Soon after, he was elected as a member of the Moldovan Parliament.

After the Soviet invasion of Bessarabia in 1940, he became a political prisoner in USSR, but in May 1941, he was exchanged for the Communist Ana Pauker.

External links
 DICTIONAR AL MEMBRILOR SFATULUI TARII DIN CHISINAU (VI)

Notes

1879 births
1949 deaths
Romanian people of Moldovan descent
People from Florești District
Moldovan MPs 1917–1918
Bessarabian Peasants' Party politicians
National Moldavian Party politicians
Prisoners and detainees of the Soviet Union